Daehaeng Kun Sunim (대행, 大行; 1927–2012) was a Korean Buddhist nun and Seon (禪) master. She taught monks as well as nuns, and helped to increase the participation of young people in Korean Buddhism.
She made laypeople a particular focus of her efforts, and broke out of traditional models of spiritual practice, teaching so that anyone could practice, regardless of monastic status or gender. She was also a major force for the advancement of Bhikkunis (nuns), heavily supporting traditional nuns’ colleges as well as the modern Bhikkuni Council of Korea. The temple she founded, Hanmaum Seon Center, grew to have 15 branches in Korea, with another 10 branches in other countries.

Life 

Daehaeng Kun Sunim was born in Seoul, Korea, in 1927. Her family was originally quite wealthy, and owned large pieces of land stretching from what is now Itaewon down to the Han River. Her father was from an old Korean military family, and had continued to secretly support resistance to the Japanese Occupation of Korea. As a result, in 1932 or 1933, the Japanese secret police, the Kempeitai, came to arrest him. He was warned a few minutes before their arrival and escaped out the back of his home with his family. They fled south across the Han River, and lived in the mountains there in a dugout hut. Unable to safely contact friends or family, they lived in poverty, having to glean fields for leftover grains of rice or vegetables.

Daehaeng Kun Sunim often slept outdoors in order to avoid her increasingly angry father. Obsessed with the question of why people suffer, she awakened when she was around eight years old. She was formally ordained by Hanam Kun Sunim in around 1948, and received Dharma transmission from him at the same time. She spent many of the years that followed wandering the mountains of Korea, wearing ragged clothes and eating only what was at hand. Later, she explained that she hadn't been pursuing some type of asceticism; rather, she was just completely absorbed in entrusting everything to her fundamental Buddha essence and observing how that affected her life. 
        
Around 1959, she settled in a hermitage below Sangwon Temple in the Chiak Mountains, and in the mid 1960s moved to the Wonju area. Later she moved to the Cheongnyangni area of Seoul, before eventually moving to Anyang, where she established the first Hanmaum Seon Center in 1972.(Daehaeng 1993, 19-141)
At the time of her passing on May 22, 2012, she was the guiding teacher of over one hundred nuns, and the Dharma teacher of over fifty monks. The center she founded has a lay membership of over one hundred fifty thousand people, and has grown to twenty five branches around the world.

Teaching Style 

 

The goal of Daehaeng Kun Sunim teachings was to help people to discover the great potential with themselves. In this way, they would be able to make their own way forward, and use the abilities inherent within them to help themselves and others. To this end, she taught people to rely upon the great wisdom and energy inherent within each of us, often called "Buddha-nature," through which she said each one of us is connected to every other being and thing.

In her own life and practice, Daehaeng Kun Sunim had experienced for herself that each and every person has this infinite potential with themselves, which she said could be called "Buddha-nature," "God," "inherent Buddha," "Father," and so on. Thus, she was determined to teach such that spiritual practice was something everyone could participate in, and which wasn't limited to certain groups such as monks or nuns.

It was important to her that people develop the strengths and tools to be able to practice and overcome whatever might confront them, without becoming dependent upon some outer teacher or guru. To this end, she taught people to rely directly upon this "inherent Buddha." (She also frequently used the Korean expressions for "foundation," "fundamental mind," "Juingong"(the one that is truly doing things," and "Hanmaum(one mind).) She did however say that an outer teacher may be necessary until people find their own, true inner teacher.

She exhorted people to work on letting go of thoughts such as "I," "mine," and "I did," as well as to be careful to interpret events positively. In addition, she warned about getting caught up in blaming others for the things one experiences. Instead, she said, understand that we've had a role in creating everything that we experience. So if we can handle them wisely, if we can entrust them to our foundation, even those will change and move in a more positive direction.

She didn't emphasize fixed periods of sitting meditation, nor did she encourage the systematic study of hwadus(kong-an). She wanted people to get used to listening inwardly and discovering what they needed to do at any particular time to brighten their own hearts, as opposed to getting caught up in other's fixed forms and traditions. To this extent, she taught people to take the issues of their own daily life as the material of their spiritual practice, and to practice entrusting that to one's inherent Buddha-nature.

About hwadus, she said that although they can still be effective, they don't work as well with modern people, and at any rate, each person has their own fundamatal hwadus that they were born with. "Why am I here?" "What am I supposed to be doing with my life?" and so on. She called these kinds of questions "naturally arising hwadus."

(See No River to Cross, 2007, Wake Up and Laugh, 2014)

Modern Versions of Traditional Buddhist Ceremonies 

In the late 1970s, Daehaeng Kun Sunim began translating the traditional ceremonies used in Korean Buddhist temples. These were used at the temples she founded, Hanmaum Seon Centers, beginning in the early 1980s, with the first collection of these ceremonies being widely published in 1987, but it would not be until late 2011 when Korea's largest Buddhist order, the Jogye Order, would begin to introduce modern Korean translations of the traditional Chinese-character(hanmun) ceremonies.
Daehaeng Kun Sunim had been concerned that laypeople were missing the benefits and help that understanding the ceremonies could provide, so she began translating them from the traditional Sino-Korean characters into modern, phonetic Korean(Hangul).
These included:
The Thousand Hands Sutra(千手經), which includes the Great Compassion Dharani(大悲咒)
The Heart Sutra(般若心經)
The Diamond Sutra(金剛經)

In addition, she translated the Flower Ornament Sutra(華嚴經). 
Her Korean version of the Thousand Hands Sutra and the Great Compassion Dharani has been published in English as A Thousand Hands of Compassion

Hanmaum Seon Center 

Hanmaum Seon Center(or Hanmaum Seonwon-한마음 선원) is large Buddhist temple complex near Seoul, South Korea. Founded in 1972, in Anyang City, it is part of the Jogye Order of Korean Buddhism. It is run by Daehaeng Kun Sunim's Bhikkuni disciples, and has fifteen Korean branches and ten overseas branches. In addition to its role as a center for teaching the Dharma, it is well known for its choir and youth groups. The youth group is the driving force behind many award-winning lanterns and floats that take part in the Buddha's Birthday parades.

Works in English 

Primary Works
No River to Cross: Trusting the enlightenment that's always right here (2007, Wisdom Publications)
Wake Up and Laugh: The Dharma teachings of Zen Master Daehaeng (2014, Wisdom Publications)
A Thousand Hands of Compassion: The chant of Korean spirituality and enlightenment (2008, Korean/English, Hanmaum Publications)
My Heart is a Golden Buddha: Buddhist stories from Korea (2012, Hanmaum Publications)

Secondary Works
Educating Unborn Children: A Sŏn Master's Teachings on T'aegyo, by Chong Go (2006), in Religions of Korea in Practice, Buswell, Robert, (ed). 144-162.
Sŏn Master Daehaeng’s ‘Doing without Doing’, by Chong Go (2010), in Makers of Modern Korean Buddhism, Park, Jin Young, (ed). SUNY Press, 227-242.
Forum on the Thousand Hands Sutra: Frankfurt Bookfair 2009, (2009, English/German, Hanmaum International Culture Institute)

Works in Korean 

Principle Works
 신행요전 Hanmaum Seonwon, 1987 (Ceremonies and Essentials)
한마음요전 Hanmaum Seonwon, 1993, (The Principles of Hanmaum[One Mind])
허공을 걷는 길, V. 1-15 Hanmaum Seonwon, 2005~, (Stepping Forward into Emptiness: The collected Dharma Talks of Daehaeng Sunim)

Major Secondary Works
道 : 김정빈長篇實名小說 by Kim Jeong Bin, Kŭlsure, 1985, (The Way: A story of finding the Path, by Kim Jeong Bin)
한마음 : 大行스님對談集, by Che-yŏl Yi, Kŭlsure, 1988 (One Mind: Conversations with Daehaeng Sunim)
無 : 大行스님法語集 by Kim Jeong Bin, Kŭlsure, 1991 (Nothing: The Dharma Teachings of Daehaeng Sunim)
한마음과 대행禪 edited by Hye Seon, Unjusa, 2013 (One Mind and Daehaeng's Seon)

See also
 Korean Buddhism
 Korean Seon

References

External links
 Hanmaum Seon Center (Hanmaum Seonwon)
 Wake Up and Laugh (blog featuring many articles about Daehaeng Kun Sunim's teachings.)

South Korean Zen Buddhists
Zen Buddhist nuns
South Korean Buddhist nuns
Seon Buddhists
1927 births
2012 deaths
20th-century Buddhist nuns
21st-century Buddhist nuns
People from Seoul